

Canadian football news in 1924
Coach Bill Hughes of Queen's introduced the use of films as a coaching technique.

The numbering of players, although used for years, was made compulsory.

The Regina Rugby Club became the Regina Roughriders.

Regular season

Final regular season standings
Note: GP = Games Played, W = Wins, L = Losses, T = Ties, PF = Points For, PA = Points Against, Pts = Points

*Bold text means that they have clinched the playoffs

League Champions

Grey Cup playoffs
Note: All dates in 1924

ARFU playoffs

Calgary won total points series 16-15.

Calgary won the total points series 21-1.

East final

Queen's advances to the Grey Cup.

West semifinal

West final

 Winnipeg wins the west but did not challenge for the Grey Cup

Playoff bracket

Grey Cup Championship

References

 
Canadian Football League seasons